Stenomax aeneus is a species of darkling beetles (insects belonging to the family Tenebrionidae) in the subfamily Tenebrioninae.

Subspecies
Stenomax aeneus aeneus (Scopoli, 1763) 
Stenomax aeneus incurvus (Küster, 1850)

Description
These beetles have a black-brown, elongated body with very long legs. The central pair of legs is hairy at the top. At the end of the abdomen, the elytra form two small spurs.

Distribution and habitat
This quite common species is present in south-eastern and Central Europe (Austria, Czech Republic, Germany, Hungary, Poland, Slovakia and Switzerland). These beetles live on branches infested with fungi and under bark of deciduous trees.

References

Tenebrioninae
Beetles of Europe
Beetles described in 1763
Taxa named by Giovanni Antonio Scopoli